The Melbourne School Bands/Strings Festival was a two-week program where school bands mainly from metropolitan Melbourne, Australia, as well as country Victoria and interstate, gather to perform, listen and participate in tutorials. The Festival has an education focus. All ensembles receive either a Gold, Silver, Bronze, Merit or Participation shield. The Melbourne School Band festival is the brain child of Barry Croll and Douglas Heywood who created the idea and event under the Music Junction Blackburn Banner in 1989 to support the ongoing development of music education in schools. The festival was produced and sponsored by Billy Hyde Music Foundation, until their parent company Billy Hyde went into liquidation in 2012.

In 2008, the Festival's 20th anniversary, over 300 concert bands, jazz ensembles and string ensembles performed at the Robert Blackwood Concert Hall and School of Music Auditorium, Monash University. Since the inception of the festival in 1989 the number of students electing to learn an instrument through their school music program has increased substantially. The festival is now one of Australia's most prestigious musical events for school musicians.

The festival is designed to support and develop instrumental music education. Not only do students have the opportunity to perform at Australia's finest venues (acoustic-wise), but they receive adjudication from an outstanding panel of adjudicators.

The festival runs for two weeks until the Festival Finale on the last Saturday of August. The Finale showcases the most outstanding ensembles from the Festival and features the distribution of the awards.

In late 2012, Allans Billy Hyde music stores went into liquidation and the Billy Hyde Foundation now ceases to exist. While select Allans Billy Hyde stores live on through a new owner the Melbourne School Bands Festival's fate is unknown.

Ensemble categories

Concert Bands

 Training Concert Band
 Novice Concert Band
 Junior Concert Band
 Intermediate Concert Band
 Symphonic Band

Jazz Ensembles

 Junior Jazz Ensemble
 Intermediate Jazz Ensemble
 Senior Jazz Ensemble

String Ensembles

 Beginner String Group
 Junior String Orchestra
 Senior String Orchestra
 Symphony Orchestra
 String Ensemble

Chief Adjudicators

Concert Bands

 1989: Col. John Bourgeois, United States Marine Band, USA
 1990: Col. John Bourgeois, United States Marine Band, USA
 1991: Dr. Wayne Bennet, University of Oregon, USA
 1992: James Swearingen, Composer, USA
 1993: Col. John Bourgeois, United States Marine Band, USA
 1994: Dr. Francis McBeth, Ouachita University, Arkansas, USA
 1995: Dr. Barry Kopetz, University of Utah, USA
 1996: Dr. Barry Kopetz, University of Utah, USA
 1997: Ed Huckeby, Composer, USA
 1998: Dr. Ben Hawkins, Transylvania University, Kentucky, USA
 1999: Ms. Paula A Crider, The University of Texas, USA
 2000: Dr. Rob McWilliams, University of Wisconsin, Oshkosh, USA
 2001: Mr. Richard L Floyd, University of Texas, Austin, USA
 2002: Mr. Robert W Smith, Composer, USA
 2003: Mr. Ken Waterworth, Australia
 2004: Mr. John M Laverty, Syracause University, USA
 2005: Ms. Paula A Crider, The University of Texas, USA
 2006: Mr. Thomas V Fraschillo, University of Southern Mississippi, USA
 2007: Mr. Jeff King, USA
 2008: Mr. Don Wilcox, West Virginia University (ret.), USA

Jazz Ensembles

 1997: Mr. Gil Askey, USA
 1998: Mr. Jeff Jervis, USA
 1999: Mr. Doug Beach, Elmhurst College, Illinois, USA
 2000: Mr. Daryl McKenzie, Australia
 2001: Mr. Reg Walsh, Australia
 2002: Mr. Patrick Crichton, WAAPA, Australia
 2003: Mr. J Richard Dunscombe, Composer, USA
 2004: Mr. Monte H Mumford, Australia
 2005: Mr. Steve Newcomb, Australia
 2006: Mr. Dean Sorenson, University of Minnesota, USA
 2007: Mr. Victor Lopez, USA
 2008: Mr. Brad Millard, Queensland University of Technology, Australia

String Ensembles

 2000: Mr. Michael Loughlin, Australia
 2001: Mr. Willem van der Vis, Australia
 2002: Ms. Andrea Keeble, Australia
 2003: Mr. Peter Bandy, Australia
 2004: Ms. Christine Belshaw, Australia
 2005: Mr. Mark Drummond, Australia
 2006: Ms. Kim Waldock, Australia
 2007: Ms. Loreta Fin, Australia
 2008: Mr. Malcolm Yuen, Australia

References

External links
 

Music festivals in Melbourne
1989 establishments in Australia
Music festivals established in 1989